Ivan Kizimov (28 May 1928 – 22 September 2019) was a Soviet and Russian equestrian and Olympic champion. He was born in Novocherkassk. He won an individual gold medal in dressage at the 1968 Summer Olympics in Mexico City, and a gold medal in team dressage at the 1972 Summer Olympics in Munich. He won a bronze medal in individual dressage at the 1970 Dressage World Championship, and team medals in 1966 (bronze), 1970 (gold) and 1974 (silver). He also won eight medals in total at the European Dressage Championships, five silver and three bronze medals.

References

External links
 
 
 

1928 births
2019 deaths
Soviet male equestrians
Russian dressage riders
Olympic equestrians of the Soviet Union
Equestrians at the 1964 Summer Olympics
Equestrians at the 1968 Summer Olympics
Equestrians at the 1972 Summer Olympics
Equestrians at the 1976 Summer Olympics
Olympic gold medalists for the Soviet Union
Olympic silver medalists for the Soviet Union
Olympic bronze medalists for the Soviet Union
People from Novocherkassk
Olympic medalists in equestrian
Medalists at the 1972 Summer Olympics
Medalists at the 1968 Summer Olympics
Medalists at the 1964 Summer Olympics
Sportspeople from Rostov Oblast